Arcadia is a semi-rural suburb of Sydney, in the state of New South Wales, Australia 42 kilometres north-west of the Sydney central business district in the local government area of Hornsby Shire. Arcadia is in the Hills District region.

History
Arcadia is derived from Arcadia, a region in Greece and in Greek mythology was a pastoral retreat.

Arcadia Post Office opened on 1 December 1895 (renamed from an earlier Upper Galston office) and closed in 1974.

Aboriginal culture
The original inhabitants of the area were the Darug people.

European settlement
The name Dooral appeared on Surveyor James Meehan's map of April 1817 and originally covered the whole area which includes present day Arcadia, as well as Dural, Glenorie and Galston.

Timber cutters opened up the area from 1817 and the early settlements were originally known as Upper, Middle, Lower, North and Little Dural. The name Arcadia was given to a public school that opened in this area in 1895 and was later adopted for the suburb.

Demographics
According to the 2016 census of Population, there were 1,385 residents in Arcadia. 81.4% of residents were born in Australia. The most common other countries of birth were England (5.9%), New Zealand (1.6%) and Italy (1.3%). 89.7% of residents spoke only English at home. Other languages spoken at home included Italian (1.5%), Mandarin (1.2%) and Arabic (1.2%). The most common responses for religious affiliation were Catholic (29.6%), No Religion (26%) and Anglican (20.4%).

Transport
Arcadia Road is the main road through the suburb that provides access from Galston and leads north into Bay Road to Berrilee and Berowra Waters. Arcadia Road also links to Cobah Road which leads north to Fiddletown.

Landmarks
 St Benedict's Monastery
 St Columb's Anglican Church
 Arcadia Public School
 Arcadia Park - Arcadia Rural Fire Service is located here
 Arcadia Community Hall

Schools
Arcadia Public School is the local primary school in Arcadia, catering for children from Kindergarten to Year 6.

A website and a book on the history of Arcadia the suburb and Arcadia Public School was created in 2014 as part of the Arcadia Public School 120th celebrations.  The 120th Anniversary committee were the recipients of the 2015 Owen Nannelli Memorial Award presented by Hornsby Shire Council.

Northholm Grammar School uses an Arcadia address. Northholm is a private school catering for Kindergarten to Year 12.

In the media
Arcadia Road and houses on Roscommon Road were featured in the Australian movie Tomorrow, When The War Began.

References

External links
  [CC-By-SA]

Suburbs of Sydney
Hornsby Shire